The 2023 Southeastern Conference baseball tournament will be held from May 23 through 28 at Hoover Metropolitan Stadium in Hoover, Alabama.  The annual tournament determined the tournament champion of the Division I Southeastern Conference in college baseball.  The tournament champion earns the conference's automatic bid to the 2023 NCAA Division I baseball tournament 

The tournament has been held every year since 1977 (with the exception of 2020), with LSU claiming twelve championships, the most of any school.  Original members Georgia and Kentucky along with 2013 addition Missouri have never won the tournament.  This is the twenty-fourth consecutive year and twenty-sixth overall that the event has scheduled to be held at Hoover Metropolitan Stadium, known from 2007 through 2012 as Regions Park.

Format and seeding
The regular season division winners claim the top two seeds and the next ten teams by conference winning percentage, regardless of division, claim the remaining berths in the tournament.  The bottom eight teams play a single-elimination opening round, followed by a double-elimination format until the semifinals, when the format  reverts to single elimination through the championship game. This is the ninth year of this format.

Bracket

Schedule

References

2023 Southeastern Conference baseball season
Southeastern Conference Baseball Tournament
SEC baseball tournament
Baseball competitions in Hoover, Alabama
College sports tournaments in Alabama